The Spreading Ground is a 2000 Canadian crime film directed by Derek Vanlint and starring Dennis Hopper. It was entered into the 22nd Moscow International Film Festival.
The film's score was composed by Wild Colonials guitarist, Shark.

Cast
 Dennis Hopper as Det. Ed DeLongpre
 Leslie Hope as Leslie DeLongpre
 Frederic Forrest as Det. Michael McGivern
 Tom McCamus as Johnny Gault
 David Dunbar as Milo Spivak
 Elizabeth Shepherd as Mayor Margaret Hackett
 Chuck Shamata as Capt. Paul Nieman
 Kim Huffman as Mrs. Osterman
 Tom Harvey as Paddy Flynn
 Rob Stefaniuk as Syphon

References

External links
 
 

2000 films
2000s crime films
Canadian crime drama films
English-language Canadian films
2000s English-language films
2000s Canadian films